Jackett is a surname. Notable people with the surname include:

 Edward Jackett (1878–1935), English international rugby union player, brother of Richard
 Kenny Jackett (born 1962), Welsh international footballer
 Richard Jackett, Cornish rugby union player, brother of Edward
 Wilbur Jackett (1912–2005), Canadian public servant and chief justice

See also
 Jackett (clothing), a type of jacket